Dortoir des grandes , is a French crime drama film from 1953, directed by Henri Decoin, written by François Chalais, starring Jean Marais and Louis de Funès. The film is also known under the titles: "Girls' Dormitory" and "Inside a Girls' Dormitory" (USA).

Plot
In a little town with a renowned college a female student is found after she was hogtied and strangled to death. Inspector Marco is assigned to catch the murderer.

Cast 
 Jean Marais: Inspector Désiré Marco
 Françoise Arnoul: Aimée de La Capelle, a resident
 Denise Grey: Mrs Hazard-Habran, the college director
 Jeanne Moreau: Julie, the waitress at the restaurant "La jument verte"
 Noël Roquevert: Emile, the owner of "La jument verte"
 Line Noro: Mrs Brigitte Tournesac, the supervisor at the collège
 Katherine Kath: Mrs Claude Persal, a professor at the college
 Umberto Almazan: Mr Da Costa, a restaurant guest
 Nicole Besnard as Chantal
 Louis de Funès: Mr Triboudot, Mérémont's photographer
 Pierre Morin: the commissioner Broche
 Jean Sylvère: the stamp collector 
 Dany Carrel: Bettina de Virmant, a resident
 Yves-Marie Maurin: the little boy at the restaurant
 : Mrs Simone Sergent, a college professor 
 Edouard Francomme: a restaurant guest
 Martine Alexis
 Marie-France

References

External links 
 
 Dortoir des grandes (1953) at the Films de France

1953 films
1953 crime drama films
French crime drama films
1950s French-language films
French black-and-white films
Films directed by Henri Decoin
Films about educators
Films based on Belgian novels
1950s French films
Films based on works by Stanislas-André Steeman